The ninth season of The Voice Brasil, premiered on Rede Globo on October 15, 2020 in the  (BRT / AMT) slot immediately following the special  re-airing of the telenovela A Força do Querer (2017).

Carlinhos Brown returned to the panel after a one-year hiatus, replacing Ivete Sangalo along with returning coaches Iza, Lulu Santos and Michel Teló, thus making it the first season to have two afro-Brazilian coaches.

Victor Alves was announced the winner of the season on December 17, 2020. This marks Iza's first win as a coach and the second female coach to win in the show's history, following Claudia Leitte. It was the first time in five years that the competition was not won by an artist from Michel Teló's team.

Teams
 Key

Blind auditions
Key

Episode 1 (Oct. 15)

Episode 2 (Oct. 20)

Episode 3 (Oct. 22)

Episode 4 (Oct. 27)

Episode 5 (Oct. 29)

Episode 6 (Nov. 03)

The Battles
Key

 Fabiana Souto was paired with Ana Carvalho for the Battles, but due to having tested positive for COVID-19, Ana was disqualified. Therefore, the Battle was cancelled and Fabiana moved on by default.

The Live Showdowns
Key

 Luana Marques (Team Teló) and Rava (Team Iza) were disqualified after having tested positive for COVID-19. Therefore, the artists paired with them for the Showdowns were relocated into one additional trio for each team.

Live shows

Elimination chart
Artist's info

Result details

Week 1 
Live Playoffs 1

Live Playoffs 2

Week 2
Semifinals

Finals

Ratings and reception

Brazilian ratings
All numbers are in points and provided by Kantar Ibope Media.

References

External links
Official website on Gshow.com

9
2020 Brazilian television seasons